Henry William Lane (21 March 1909 – March 1977) was an English professional footballer who scored 74 goals in 271 appearances in the Football League playing for Birmingham, Southend United and Plymouth Argyle.

Career
Lane was born in Hednesford, Staffordshire. A forward, he joined Birmingham from Staffordshire local football. He made his debut in the First Division on 29 November 1930, deputising for Johnny Crosbie at inside right in a game at Bolton Wanderers which Birmingham lost 2–0. Lane played once more that season, but was unable to establish himself as a first-team player. He was released in May 1933 and joined Southend United of the Third Division South.

Lane played 177 games in all competitions for Southend in nearly five seasons with the club, scoring 58 goals at a rate of one every three games. He was their leading scorer in the 1935–36 season with 17 goals, and followed up with another 17 the next season, including two hat-tricks. In March 1938, he moved up to the Second Division with Plymouth Argyle.

He was a regular in Plymouth's first team until the Second World War put an end to competitive football, though without scoring as freely as he had for Southend. He remained with Plymouth for a couple of months playing in the wartime regional league, and later made guest appearances for Nottingham Forest, Northampton Town, West Bromwich Albion and Port Vale in wartime competition. In May 1946, Lane rejoined Southend. He contributed 21 goals in 75 games over the next three seasons, finally retiring from professional in May 1949 at the age of 40. In 1949, Lane signed for Chelmsford City. On 24 August 1949, Lane became the oldest ever debutant for the club in a 2–1 win against Barry Town.

Lane died in Cannock, Staffordshire, in 1977 aged about 68.

Career statistics
Source:

Notes

References

1909 births
1977 deaths
People from Hednesford
English footballers
Association football forwards
Hednesford Town F.C. players
Birmingham City F.C. players
Southend United F.C. players
Plymouth Argyle F.C. players
Chelmsford City F.C. players
English Football League players
Nottingham Forest F.C. wartime guest players
Northampton Town F.C. wartime guest players
West Bromwich Albion F.C. wartime guest players
Port Vale F.C. wartime guest players